Milton D'Mello (born c. 1925, date of death unknown) was a Pakistani field hockey player. He competed in the men's tournament at the 1948 Summer Olympics.

Born Roman Catholic Christian, D'Mello was of Goan ancestry.

References

External links

1920s births
Year of death missing
Pakistani male field hockey players
Olympic field hockey players of Pakistan
Field hockey players at the 1948 Summer Olympics
Field hockey players from Karachi
Pakistani people of Goan descent
Pakistani Roman Catholics
St. Patrick's High School, Karachi alumni